The Humboldt Crabs are a collegiate summer baseball team located in Arcata, California. Playing in every season since they were founded in 1945 by Lou Bonomini, later joined by Ned Barsuglia, the Crabs are the oldest continually-operated summer collegiate baseball team in American baseball. Through the 2019 season the Crabs have a total record of 2557 wins and 803 losses. The Crabs did not play the 2020 season due to the COVID-19 pandemic.

Crabs games are broadcast on KEJB 1480 AM, the Humboldt Crabs YouTube Channel, and stats are live on GameChanger App. Most games also include the Crab Grass Band, formed in 1983, that play songs in between innings.

Brief background
Originally the Eureka Paladini Crabs, named for the Paladini Fish Company who sponsored the team from 1945 to 1947.

In the 77-year history of the Humboldt Crabs, over 300 players have continued on to play professional baseball, with over 60 former Crabs going all the way to the Major Leagues. Dane Iorg played for the Crabs from 1968 to 1970. John Oldham, a Crabs pitcher in 1952–53, was the first to make it all the way, playing for the Cincinnati Reds in 1956. Leo Rosales, who pitched for the 2002 Crabs, was called up to the Arizona Diamondbacks in 2008. 2003 Crabs infielder Brett Pill was called up to the San Francisco Giants in 2011, and was on the team's 2012 roster as a 1st baseman. Most recently, Vinny Pestano, Bradley Zimmer, and Mike Redmond are all former Crabs.

Their best season, record-wise, was 1985 when the team won 46 consecutive games to start the season. Future Major Leaguers Mike Harkey, Eric Gunderson, Steve Olin, and Scott Chiamparino led a dominant pitching staff.

The Crabs play the majority of their games at home at the Arcata Ball Park, owned by the City of Arcata.  The team is made up of college players from different NCAA programs throughout the U.S. The Humboldt Crabs are a non-profit baseball organization operated by a 12-member all-volunteer Board of Directors. Rivals include the Redding Colt .45s, the Fontanetti's Athletics, the Corvallis Knights, and the Seattle Studs. Most recent opponents include Healdsburg Prune Packers, San Luis Obispo Blues, Seals Baseball, Walnut Creek Crawdads, Solano Mudcats, Marysville Gold Sox and many others from the CCL League. Past opponents include House of David, the Indianapolis Clowns, the Oakland Larks, the Los Angeles White Sox, the San Diego Tigers, the Portland Roses, Owl Drug, the Alaska Goldpanners, the Redding Browns, the Bend Elks, the Bellingham Bells, the North Pole Nicks, the Valley Green Giants, the Santa Barbara Foresters, the Anchorage Glacier Pilots, the Boulder Collegians, the Sacramento Smokeys, the Grand Junction Eagles,  and Athletes in Action. Through the years the Crabs have run multiple secondary teams, the Humboldt Ports (1962), the Humboldt All-Stars (1996-2006), and the Humboldt Steelheads (2007-2011).

In 2007, the team's 63rd consecutive season, the Crabs overall season record was 42 - 12; in 2008, the Crabs drew an average of 874 fans to the ball park and went 35 - 13 for the season; in 2009 the Crabs record was 48–11; in their 66th season, 2010, the Crabs went 43 - 9. Most recently, the 2019 team went 33-16. Find stats on the GameChanger app.

The Humboldt Crabs are a non-profit, community-oriented organization. Its mission is four-fold:
To promote family entertainment by providing high-quality summer collegiate baseball games to the public at a reasonable price;
To provide talented collegiate-level baseball players with a positive summer baseball experience; 
To support youth sports programs (with an emphasis on baseball or softball) in the Humboldt County area with contributions of funding and/or equipment as funds permit in addition to annual baseball skills camps and clinics operated by Humboldt Crabs players and coaches;
To preserve and build the tradition of Humboldt Crabs Baseball.

2022 player awards
Most Valuable Player: Tyler Davis
Offensive Player of the Year: Javier Feliz
Co-Pitcher of the Year: Caleb Ruiz
Co-Pitcher of the Year: Marcelo Saldana
"Coaches Award" - Kevin Morsching/Scott Heinig Memorial Award:

Organization

Humboldt Crabs Baseball, Inc is a 501(c)(4) community-owned organization. A volunteer board of directors rely on the support of community members & sponsors to keep the Humboldt Crabs Baseball operation functioning.

President
David Sharp

Coaching staff
Robin Guiver, Manager
Eric Giacone, Pitching Coach
John Bryant, Hitting Coach
Brad Morgan, Assistant Coach

Trainers: Nate Kees

2021 team roster

Pitchers
Manny Casillas
Wesley Harper
Jack Nillson
Sean Prozell
Kaden Riccomini
Caleb Ruiz
Will Springer
Owen Stevenson
Cole Tremain
Cade Van Allen
Adam Walker
Chad Wilson
Catchers
Andrew Allanson
Dylan McPhillips
Infielders
Aaron Casillas
Ethan Fischel
Gabe Giosso
David Morgan
Outfielders
Tyler Ganus
Luke Powell
Ethan Smith
Utility Players
Drake Digiorno
Konner Kinkade
Josh Lauck
Aidan Morris

Board of director
Note: The Board of Directors change from year to year. Vikki Rossi, Matt Filar, Ellen Barthman, Erik Fraser, Roger Lorenzetti, Tracy Mack, Larry Zerlang, Michelle Briggs, Neil Butler

Far West League
The Crabs joined the Far West League (FWL), which had ten teams participating in the 2011 season.  The five-team FWL North Division included the Humboldt Crabs, Nor Cal Pirates, Redding Colt .45s, Nevada Bullets (formerly Reno Aces), and Southern Oregon RiverDawgs.  The five-team FWL South Division included the Atwater Aviators, Fontanetti's Athletics, Neptune Beach Pearl, California Glory, and Fresno Cardinals.  The Crabs were part of the West Coast League/Tri-State (which was associated with the West Coast League in the Pacific Northwest) then merged with the Pacific West Baseball League to form the FWL.  (The California Seals were originally an eleventh team in the FWL but are on hiatus for the 2011 season.)

2011 league champions
This inaugural year of the Far West League culminated with the top five League teams competing in a double-elimination Tournament, hosted by the Humboldt Crabs and played in the Arcata Ball Park, August 5–7.  The Humboldt Crabs (21 - 6), with the best record in regular season league play, were the top-seeded team, but lost their first game to fourth-seed Fontanetti's Athletics, 1–0, on August 5.  To avoid being eliminated, the Crabs had to win four games in a row.  On August 6, the Crabs shut out the Atwater Aviators, 2–0, in an elimination game.  On August 7 the Crabs won three games in one day, starting with Fontanetti's Athletics, 7–2, (who had beaten the Crabs 2 of 3 games in regular-season play); then facing the Neptune Beach Pearl who had won 8 of their previous 9 games, and who were as yet undefeated in the Tournament.  By winning four in a row, including 6-3 and 5-1 wins over the Pearl, the Crabs avoided elimination and won the tournament and the championship.

The Humboldt Crabs finished the 2011 season with records of 40-13 overall, 25–7 in League/Conference play.

The Humboldt Crabs rank #22 from among over 220 summer collegiate league teams in the nation for the week of August 9, 2011, by Perfect Game USA.

The Far West League has since disbanded, but the Crabs were league champions all three years in its inception.

Year by year records
(*)denotes California State Semi-Pro Champion

(^) denotes West of the Rockies Tournament Champion

(<) denotes All-American Invitational Champion

(~) denotes season not played due to the COVID-19 pandemic

National Rankings through 1985 are for finishes at the National Baseball Congress World Series in Wichita, Kansas.

(*)denotes California State Semi-Pro Champion

(^) denotes West of the Rockies Tournament Champion

(<) denotes All-American Invitational Champion

(~) denotes season not played due to the COVID-19 pandemic

Crabs in MLB
69 former Crabs went on the play in the Major Leagues: Dave Melton (1949), John Oldham (1952-1953, 1961-1962), Chuck Nieson (1961), Danny Frisella (1964), Rich Nye (1965), Mike Paul (1965), Buzz Stephen (1965), Sandy Vance (1966), Steve Hovley (1966), Jim Nettles (1966), Bob Gallagher (1966), Greg Shanahan (1967-1970), Ken Hottman (1968), Ken Crosby (1968), Rick Miller (1968), Lute Barnes (1967-1968), Dane Iorg (1968-1970), Bruce Bochte (1969), Bill Bonham (1969), Eric Raich (1970), Rich Dauer (1972), Frank LaCorte (1972), Warren Brusstar (1973), Steve Davis (1973), Barry Bonnell (1974), Sandy Wihtol (1974), Randy Niemann (1975), Bruce Benedict (1976), Joe Price (1976), Jim Wessinger (1976), Tim Tolman (1976), Mike Gates (1977), Stefan Wever (1977), Craig Lefferts (1978), Rich Bordi (1978), Jim Scranton (1978), Tom Dodd (1978-1979), Rod Booker (1979), Jack Fimple (1979-1980), La Schelle Tarver (1980), Jim Wilson (1981), Colin Ward (1981), Shane Turner (1982), Jose Mota (1983), John Fishel (1983), Scott Anderson (1982-1983), Xavier Hernandez (1984), Mike Harkey (1985), Scott Chiamparino (1985), Steve Olin (1985-86), Eric Gunderson (1985-86), Dennis Springer (1986), Scott Lewis (1986), Victor Cole (1987), Ed Giovanola (1988), Greg Gohr (1988), Gary Wilson (1989), Mike Redmond (1991), Mike Kinkade (1992), Roland Delamaza (1992), Mike Thurman (1993), Rob Ryan (1993), Josh Pearce (1998), Leo Rosales (2002), Brett Pill (2003), Vinnie Pestano (2004), Bradley Zimmer (2012), and James Outman (2016).
Four players, Lee Gregory (1966-67), Bill Serena (1961), Eddie Kearse (1951), and Floyd Stromme (1950) played for the Crabs after playing in the MLB.

Famous Crabs
Bill Prentice (1946), Dick Clegg (1949), Roger Osenbaugh (1949-1950), Mark Marquess (1966-1967), Augie Garrido (1966), Tom Beyers (1977-78), Pat Casey (1980), Mike Dotterer (1982), Reggie Christiansen (player 1995-1996, coach 2000), Bob Milano (player 1962-1963, coach 1979), Kerwin Danley (1982), Steve Detwiler (2007, 2009), Russ McQueen (1971-1972), Gary Henderson (1983), Ed Hemingway (coach 1953), Tim Wheeler (coach 2016), Tyler Ganus (2021), Berdy Harr (coach 1976-1977), Nick Fuscardo (coach 1983-1984), Dan Yokubaitis (1981-1982), and Ron Mingo (2000-2003).

Crabs Hall of Fame
Class of 2012: Ned Barsuglia, Bob Bonomini, Lou Bonomini, Adam Carr, Steve Fish, Mike Harkey, Dane Iorg, Rico Pastori, Greg Shanahan, Don Terbush, 1985 Team (51 Wins, 3 Losses)

Class of 2013: Eddie Oliveira, Don Carter, Sandy Vance, Mark Marquess, Randy Niemann, Craig Lefferts, Steve Olin, Tom Giacomini, Mike Redmond, Brian Blauser, 1968 Team (42 Wins, 11 Losses)

Class of 2014: Eldridge “Red” Hunt, Carl Del Grande, Dennis Pontoni, Augie Garrido, Rich Nye, Rich Bordi, Rod Booker, Steve Neel, Gary Wilson, Jeff Giacomini, 1981 Team (43 Wins, 10 Losses)

Class of 2015: Fred Papini, Douglas Clayton, Billy Olsen, Lute Barnes, Paul Ziegler, Shane Turner, Scott Eskra, Joe Gerber, Nick Giacone, 2003 Team (43 Wins, 5 Losses)

Class of 2016: Mark Pirrucello, John Oldham, Bruce Benedict, Jim Wilson, Burt Nordstrom, Chris DeBoo, Richard Cates, Jerry Nutter, Elvira Bonomini, 1999 Team (45 Wins, 3 Losses)

No Hall of Fame Class of 2017

Class of 2018: John Austin, Lee Iorg, Troy Schader, Leo Rosales, Pat Clements, Bob Milano, Jim "Spider" Thomas, Jack Fimple, Ugo Giuntini, 1990 team (44 Wins, 3 Losses)

Class of 2019: Hans Smith, Wade Hammond, Gregg Reynolds, Eric Gunderson, Al Masterson, Larry Taylor, David Ferres, Ken Dunaway, Joe Gallaty, Mary "Baseball Betty" Lacefield

No Hall of Fame Class of 2020

No Hall of Fame Class of 2021

Class of 2022: TBA

References

External links
 
 Video documentary "Humboldt Crabs Baseball," A Nutter Production

Amateur baseball teams in California
Arcata, California
Tourist attractions in Humboldt County, California
1945 establishments in California
Baseball teams established in 1945